Mostafizur Rahman Mostafa is a Bangladeshi politician, and current City Mayor Of Rangpur. He was elected as mayor of the Rangpur City Corporation in 2017 city election by defeating Awami League Candidate and then sitting mayor Sharfuddin Ahmed Jhantu. He is the president of Rangpur Jatiyo Party City unit and also a presidium member of Jatiyo Party(Ershad). Earlier, he also served as Rangpur Jatiya Party (JP) general secretary.

Early life and education 
Mostafa completed his BSC from Carmichael College, Rangpur. He started his career as School teacher.

Career 
Before contesting Mayoral election in 2012 as an independent candidate he served as Upazila Chairman since 2009. In 2012 mayoral election he got 78600 votes which. In 2017 2nd Rangpur city corporation election he gained ticket from Party Chairman H M Ershad. In the election, Mostafizar Rahman Mostafa won 160,489 votes with party polls logo ‘plough’ whereas his nearest rival the Awami League's Sharfuddin Ahmed Jhantu, the outgoing mayor who ran with ‘boat’ logo, got 62,400 votes. In RpCC Elections- 2022, he re-elected again where he bagged 1,46,798 votes.

Personal life 
Mostafa is married to Jelly Rahman.

References 

Mayors of Rangpur
Jatiya Party politicians
People from Rangpur District
Year of birth missing (living people)
Living people